George Newson (born 27 July 1932) is an English composer and pianist who made some important contributions to British electronic and avant garde music during the 1960s and 1970s and has subsequently composed large and small-scale works in many musical forms and styles, from songs and chamber music to choral works and opera. As a photographer, Newson has taken portraits of many of his composer contemporaries.

Music career
Born in Shadwell, East London, Newson began studying piano at the age of 14 when he won a scholarship to the Blackheath Conservatoire of Music. He started to play in modern jazz bands and to compose, while continuing his studies part time at Morley College with Peter Racine Fricker and Iain Hamilton. His first publicly performed work was the Octet for wind of 1951, which shows the influence of the modern jazz bands the composer was playing with at the time.

In 1955 he won a further scholarship to the Royal Academy of Music under Alan Bush and Howard Ferguson, where he also made contact with contemporaries such as Harrison Birtwistle and Hugh Wood. In post-graduate studies at Dartington and Darmstadt in the late 1950s he came into contact with more radical figures, such as Elliott Carter, Luciano Berio, Bruno Maderna and Luigi Nono. From 1959 he worked as a music teacher at Twickenham Technical College and Peckham Manor School.

Electronic compositions followed in the 1960s, first with the BBC Radiophonic Workshop, where he worked with Delia Derbyshire and produced the music for an experimental drama, The Man Who Collected Sounds with radio producer Douglas Cleverdon. Derbyshire became a lifelong friend. In 1967 he embarked on a three month journey across the US, stopping to work at various music studios, including Trumansburg, New York with Robert Moog and the University of Urbana. He also met John Cage during the trip. Back in the UK he produced his tape composition Silent Spring, inspired by Rachel Carson's book and using birdsong recorded at London Zoo. It was premiered at the Queen Elizabeth Hall Redcliffe Concert on 15th January 1968 - one of the earliest concerts of electronic music by British composers. Other electronic pieces from this period include Canto II for clarinet and tape at RAI, Milan and Genus II at the University of Utrecht. 

Newson's abstract electronic works of the 1960s evolved towards an avant garde, post-modern style, incorporating radical collage and theatrical elements, although the basis of his music is often tonal, melodic and lyrical. In 1971 came his highest profile commission, by the BBC's William Glock. The staged oratorio Arena was written for the Proms, performed in the Roundhouse and conducted by Pierre Boulez, with Cleo Laine as soloist and the The King's Singers. Using a collage of diverse vocal, textual, dramatic and political elements, the piece shows the influence of Berio's Sinfonia of 1968. Another BBC commission followed in 1972: Praise to the Air for chorus and instrumental ensemble, setting poetry by George Macbeth.

During the 1970s Newson was appointed Cramb Research Fellow at Glasgow University and Composer-in-Residence at Queen’s University, Belfast. In 1984 he was invited by Boulez to work at IRCAM in Paris. The Ensemble intercontemporain, commissioned him to compose I Will Encircle the Sun (Aphelion/Perihelion), which they performed in 1989.

Newson has continued to compose. His more recent work includes the one act opera Mrs Fraser’s Frenzy, written for the Canterbury and Cheltenham Festivals in 1994, a percussion concerto Both Arms for Evelyn Glennie in 2002, and the piano trio Cantiga (2004), performed at the Rye Festival. He lives in the village of Stone in Oxney in Kent, near the border of East Sussex. There are few commercial recordings of his music but some excepts are available on SoundCloud.

Photographic career
Newson is also known for his photography, particularly for his portraits of composers. There are two self-portraits at the National Gallery in London, and more than 50 others, including portraits of David Bedford, Richard Rodney Bennett, Harrison Birtwistle, Alexander Goehr, Hans Keller, Nicholas Maw, Andrzej Panufnik and Priaulx Rainier. He is also an amateur ornithologist, something celebrated in Michael Longley's poem Stone-in-Oxney, which is dedicated to Newson.

Selected works
(see also: List of works, British Music Collection)
 Arena (1971) for jazz singer, choir, raconteur, soprano saxophone and orchestra
 Cantiga (2004), piano trio
 Circle (1985), song cycle for soprano and ensemble, text Peter Porter
 Concerto for Percussion (Both Arms) (2002),  commissioned by Evelyn Glennie, Canterbury Festival
 Concerto for two violins (1994), commissioned by the Sofia Philharmonic Orchestra, UK premiere 2006
 The Dead, opera, text by Paul Muldoon.
 From the New Divan for viola, choir and orchestra (published Lengnick)
 The General (1980), music theatre for actors and brass band, text Alan Sillitoe
 Mrs Fraser’s Frenzy (1994), one act opera
 Oh My America (1985), chorus, narrator and orchestra
 Praise to the Air (1972), chorus and orchestra
 Silent Spring, (1968), electronics (also version for voice, children's choir and ensemble)
 Songs for the Turning Year (1993), Proms commission
 Sonograms 1 & 11 (1995) for Orchestre National de Lille
 String Quartet No 1 (1958)
 String Quartet No 2
 Symphony No 2, Even to the Edge of Doom (1976)
 Three Interiors (1958), song cycle for soprano, wind quintet and double bass, words Leonard Smith
 Twenty-seven Days for orchestra (fp. Royal Festival Hall, 24 May, 1970)
 Two Elegies and a Prayer (2021), for two voices and flute, settings of Michael Longley and Fleur Adcock
 Valentine (1975), collage of words and music, soprano, speaker and ensemble
 Wind Quintet (1964)
 The Winter’s Tale (1998), opera

References

1932 births
Living people
20th-century classical composers
21st-century classical composers
20th-century British composers
21st-century British composers
Electronic composers
English electronic musicians
British photographers